The 2005 Checker Auto Parts 500 was a NASCAR Nextel Cup Series stock car race held on November 13, 2005 at Phoenix International Raceway in Avondale, Arizona. Contested over 312 laps on the 1-mile (1.609 km) asphalt oval, it was the thirty-fifth race of the 2005 Nextel Cup Series season. Kyle Busch of Hendrick Motorsports won the race.

Background
Phoenix International Raceway – also known as PIR – is a one-mile, low-banked tri-oval race track located in Avondale, Arizona. It is named after the nearby metropolitan area of Phoenix. The motorsport track opened in 1964 and currently hosts two NASCAR race weekends annually. PIR has also hosted the IndyCar Series, CART, USAC and the Rolex Sports Car Series. The raceway is currently owned and operated by International Speedway Corporation.

The raceway was originally constructed with a  road course that ran both inside and outside of the main tri-oval. In 1991 the track was reconfigured with the current  interior layout. Lights were installed around the track in 2004 following the addition of a second annual NASCAR race weekend.

Summary
The Checker Auto Parts 500 was held November 13 at Phoenix International Raceway. Denny Hamlin, who hadn't competed in a full season in Nextel Cup at the time, won the pole. The race was surrounded by controversy when defending champion Kurt Busch was cited for reckless driving and was reported by a cop to have "had the whiff of alcohol", although he was below the legal limit of .008 in Arizona, when it was discovered Kurt Busch actually had .0018 in alcohol.  Due to his actions, he was suspended by Roush Racing for the rest of the season, and Kenny Wallace took the wheel of the 97 car. Ironically, his brother Kyle won the race, and in victory lane, he criticized the media for their handling of the case.

Jerry Robertson would make his only NASCAR Nextel Cup Series start in this event.

Top 10 results

Race Statistics
 Time of race: 3:02:23
 Average Speed: 
 Pole Speed: 134.173
 Cautions: 9 for 44 laps
 Margin of Victory: 0.609 sec
 Lead changes: 10
 Percent of race run under caution: 14.1%        
 Average green flag run: 26.8 laps

References 

Checker Auto Parts 500
Checker Auto Parts 500
NASCAR races at Phoenix Raceway